Robert Harrison Tom Turner (26 October 1888 – 13 September 1947) was an English first-class cricketer active 1906–27 who played for Nottinghamshire. He was born in Langley Mill; died in Shipley, Derbyshire.

References

1888 births
1947 deaths
English cricketers
Nottinghamshire cricketers
People from Amber Valley
Cricketers from Derbyshire